Ponciano B. Saldaña (November 19, 1928 – July 21, 2006, in Makati, Philippines) was a Filipino former basketball player who competed in the 1952 Summer Olympics.

References

External links
 

1928 births
2006 deaths
Olympic basketball players of the Philippines
Basketball players at the 1952 Summer Olympics
Asian Games medalists in basketball
Basketball players at the 1954 Asian Games
Philippines men's national basketball team players
Filipino men's basketball players
Asian Games gold medalists for the Philippines
Medalists at the 1954 Asian Games
San Beda Red Lions basketball players
1954 FIBA World Championship players